Foster DeWitt (born 26 May 1996) is a Canadian rugby union player, currently playing for the New England Free Jacks of Major League Rugby (MLR) and the Canada national team. His preferred position is hooker or prop.

Professional career
DeWitt signed for Major League Rugby side New England Free Jacks for the 2022 Major League Rugby season. 

DeWitt debuted for Canada against Belgium during the 2021 end-of-year rugby union internationals.

References

External links
itsrugby.co.uk Profile

1996 births
Living people
Canada international rugby union players
Rugby union hookers
Rugby union props
Canadian rugby union players
Sportspeople from British Columbia
New England Free Jacks players